Sobczyk is a Polish surname. Notable people with the surname include:

 Alex Sobczyk (born 1997), Austrian footballer
 Katarzyna Sobczyk (1945–2010), Polish singer

See also
 Sobczak

Polish-language surnames